Solitalea koreensis is a Gram-negative, rod-shaped and non-spore-forming bacterium from the genus of Solitalea which has been isolated from greenhouse soil in Yongin in  Korea.

References

External links
Type strain of Solitalea koreensis at BacDive -  the Bacterial Diversity Metadatabase	

Sphingobacteriia
Bacteria described in 2009